This is a list of oldest buildings and structures in Halifax, Nova Scotia, Canada that were constructed before 1935.

1750-1799

1800-1849

1850-1899

1900-1935

See also

History of Nova Scotia
List of historic places in the Halifax Regional Municipality
List of National Historic Sites of Canada in Nova Scotia
List of historic places in Nova Scotia
List of oldest buildings and structures in Toronto
History of the Halifax Regional Municipality
List of oldest buildings in Canada

References

Oldest buildings and structures in Halifax
Halifax
Buildings